Paratropes is a genus of cockroaches within the family Ectobiidae. There are currently 14 species assigned to the genus. Members of this genus are distributed across North and South America in countries such as Mexico, Colombia, Panama and Peru.

Species 

 Paratropes aequatorialis 
 Paratropes bilunata 
 Paratropes biolleyi 
 Paratropes elegans 
 † Paratropes fossilis  
 Paratropes heydeniana 
 Paratropes lateralis 
 Paratropes lycoides 
 Paratropes metae 
 Paratropes mexicana 
 Paratropes otunensis 
 Paratropes pensa 
 Paratropes phalerata 
 Paratropes seabrai

References 

Cockroach genera